Gibert is a surname, and may refer to:

Camille-Melchior Gibert (1797–1866), French dermatologist
Jean-Amédée Gibert (1869–1945), French architect
Jean-Pierre Gibert (1660–1736), French lawyer
Jordi Sangrá Gibert (born 1980), Spanish canoer
Julien Gibert (footballer, born 1976), French footballer
Julien Gibert (footballer, born 1978), French footballer
Maria Caroline Gibert de Lametz (1793–1879), French actress
Montserrat Gibert (born 1948), Spanish (Catalan) politician

Catalan-language surnames
French-language surnames